Brad Armstrong may refer to:

 Brad Armstrong (director) (born 1965), pornographic actor and director
 Brad Armstrong (wrestler) (1961–2012), ring name of Bradley James
 Brad Armstrong (Coronation Street), a character from the British soap opera Coronation Street
 Brad Armstrong (Home and Away), a character from the Australian soap opera Home and Away
 Brad Armstrong, the protagonist of LISA: The Painful RPG